Brad Wilcox may refer to:

 Bradley R. Wilcox  (born 1959), American LDS educator and Counselor in the LDS Young Men's Presidency
 W. Bradford Wilcox (born 1970), American sociologist